Héctor Sosa (born 12 May 1979 in Areguá, Paraguay) is a Paraguayan footballer who is currently a free agent.

Teams
  Sol de América 1997–2003
  12 de Octubre 2004–2006
  Quilmes 2006–2008
  Rubio Ñu 2009
  Alianza Lima 2010
  Unión Comercio 2011–2012

External links
 
 
 

1979 births
Living people
Paraguayan footballers
Paraguayan expatriate footballers
Club Sol de América footballers
12 de Octubre Football Club players
Club Rubio Ñu footballers
Quilmes Atlético Club footballers
Club Alianza Lima footballers
Unión Comercio footballers
Expatriate footballers in Peru
Expatriate footballers in Argentina
People from Areguá
Association football defenders
General Díaz footballers
Club Sportivo San Lorenzo footballers
Paraguay international footballers
Resistencia S.C. footballers
Sportivo Iteño footballers